Boima Karpeh (born 16 June 1984), also known as Jerry Karpeh, is a Liberian professional footballer who last played for South China in the Hong Kong Premier League.

Biography
Karpeh was the Football West State League top goal scorer in 2007 playing for Floreat Athena where he won the club's Fairest & Best Award.

A-League club Perth Glory signed Karpeh during the 2007/2008 season playing seven games for the club.

Karpeh trialled with A-League club Newcastle Jets in September 2007 but a contract was not negotiated between Karpeh and the club.

Scoring many goals for his next clubs he then made a decision in 2011 to move to India and play for Churchill Brothers and become winner of the  2011 IFA Shield Cup with them.

Next year found him in Indonesia having a complete season with 23 games and 7 goals scored for Persisam Putra Samarinda.

In August 2012 Jerry received invitation to travel in Iran and negotiate a contract with Sanat Naft but a contract wasn't established due to visa problems.

Lately in January 2013 returned to India for the second time and signed a five-month contract until end of season to play for Pune FC and scored his first goal by opening the score in club's biggest win ever against United Sikkim.
In the I-League match against Shillong Lajong F.C. on 25 March, he was brought in as a substitute for Pierre Djidjia Douhou on the 46th minute, and he equalised from a Jeje Lalpekhlua pass on the 51st minute, and then equalised again on the 59th minute from an Othallo Tabia cross to ensure a 2-2 draw.

Personal life
Boima Karpeh is a brother to Kailo Karpeh who currently plays soccer at Jubilee FC, and recently played for Australia Football West State League club Bayswater City SC that plays in the Liberian Premier League.

Honors

Club honors
Perth SC
Football West State League Premier Division : 2005

Floreat Athena
Football West State League Premier Division : 2007

Churchill Brothers
2011 IFA Shield winner

Putra Samarinda
Inter Island Cup: runner-up: 2012

Individual honors
Football West State League Premier Division Top Scorer: 2007
Durand Cup Top scorer: 2014

References

External links

1984 births
Liberian footballers
Living people
Perth Glory FC players
A-League Men players
Whittlesea Zebras players
I-League players
Expatriate footballers in India
Liberian expatriate sportspeople in India
Expatriate footballers in Indonesia
Liga 1 (Indonesia) players
Australian expatriate sportspeople in Indonesia
Liberian expatriate sportspeople in Indonesia
Sporting Clube de Goa players
Sportspeople from Monrovia
Association football forwards
Australian expatriate sportspeople in India
Bayswater City SC players
Perth SC players
Floreat Athena FC players